Puneet Kumar (born 22 June 1998) is an Indian cricketer. He made his List A debut for Jammu & Kashmir in the 2017–18 Vijay Hazare Trophy on 12 February 2018. He made his Twenty20 debut on 12 January 2021, for Jammu and Kashmir in the 2020–21 Syed Mushtaq Ali Trophy.

References

External links
 

1998 births
Living people
Indian cricketers
Place of birth missing (living people)
Jammu and Kashmir cricketers